Theodore J. Wardlaw is an American Presbyterian minister and academic administrator. He is president of Austin Presbyterian Theological Seminary in Austin, Texas.

He holds the following degrees:
Bachelor of Arts degree from Presbyterian College in Clinton, South Carolina
DMin from Union Presbyterian Seminary in Richmond, Virginia
Master of Sacred Theology degree (American Church History) from Yale University Divinity School

References

American Presbyterian ministers
Heads of universities and colleges in the United States
Living people
Year of birth missing (living people)
Presbyterian College alumni
Union Presbyterian Seminary alumni
Yale Divinity School alumni
Seminary presidents